Yevgeny Kafelnikov and Daniel Vacek were the defending champions but lost in the first round to Nicolás Lapentti and Marat Safin.

David Prinosil and Sandon Stolle won in the final 6–3, 6–4 against Piet Norval and Kevin Ullyett.

Seeds

  David Adams /  John-Laffnie de Jager (first round)
  Yevgeny Kafelnikov /  Daniel Vacek (first round)
  Tomás Carbonell /  Jared Palmer (first round)
  David Prinosil /  Sandon Stolle (champions)

Draw

External links
 1999 CA-TennisTrophy Doubles draw

Doubles